Las gemelas may refer to:
Las gemelas (1961 telenovela)
 The Twin Girls, a 1963 Spanish film
Las gemelas (1972 telenovela)